Thomas McArthur Anderson (January 21, 1836 – May 8, 1917) was a career officer in the United States Army who served as a general in the Spanish–American War and the Philippine–American War.

Biography

Early life and Civil War
Anderson was born in Chillicothe, Ohio, January 22, 1836. He graduated at Mount St. Mary's college in 1855, and attended the Cincinnati School of Law and was admitted to the bar in Cincinnati in 1858. He practiced law at Newport, Kentucky from 1858 to 1861.

When the Civil War broke out, Anderson enlisted in the volunteer army as a private in the 6th Ohio Volunteer Infantry. Under the influences of his uncle, Robert Anderson of Fort Sumter fame, he received a commission in the Regular Army as second lieutenant in the 2nd U.S. Cavalry on May 15, 1861. On Oct. 8, 1861, he was promoted to captain in the 12th U.S. Infantry. He received brevet promotions to major for the Wilderness on Aug. 1, 1864, and lieutenant colonel for Spotsylvania in August, 1864.

He stayed in the regular army after the war's end. He served in the 10th U.S. Infantry, 9th U.S. Infantry and finally rose to the rank of colonel of the 14th U.S. Infantry on September 6, 1886. In February 1897 Anderson and 100 soldiers of the 14th set up a base in Skagway and Dyea, Alaska at the start of the Klondike gold rush to protect miners along the trails into Canada as well as to keep watch on the border. At the start of the Spanish–American War, he asked for and received reassignment.

Spanish–American War
Anderson was appointed brigadier general of U.S. Volunteers on May 4, 1898. He took command of the first "Philippine Expeditionary Force" during the Spanish–American War. His troops were the first to land in the Philippines following George Dewey's naval victory there. Major General Wesley Merritt had been appointed as the overall U.S. Army commander in the Philippines and arrived with the third Philippine Expeditionary Force. Merritt reorganized the three expeditionary forces into the Eighth Army Corps. Anderson was given command of the corps' 2d Division (brigade and division numbers at the time were only unique within a corps) with Brigadier Generals Francis V. Greene and Arthur MacArthur as his brigade commanders. Anderson fought at the battle of Manila against the Spanish. He was promoted to major general of U.S. Volunteers on August 13, 1898. He was advanced to the Regular Army grade of Major General after his retirement on January 21, 1900.

Philippine–American War
When the Spanish–American War ended, Anderson stayed in Manila where he was placed in command of the 1st Division, VIII Corps and saw action in the 1899 Battle of Manila during the Philippine–American War. After the U.S. forces broke the Filipino siege, Anderson led his division in minor engagements at Santana, San Pedro and Guadalupe. In March 1899, he was promoted to the rank of brigadier general in the Regular Army.

General Anderson was a member of the Grand Army of the Republic and a Veteran Companion of both the Military Order of the Loyal Legion of the United States and the Military Order of Foreign Wars. He was also a member of the Oregon Society of the Sons of the American Revolution. He was also commandant of the Pennsylvania Soldiers' Home in 1901.

He was placed on the retired list Jan. 20, 1900. Anderson received the degree LL.D. from Mount St. Mary's college in 1899. He died on May 8, 1917. He is buried in Arlington National Cemetery.

Family 
He was married to Elizabeth Van Winkle of New Jersey. Their son, Thomas MacArthur Anderson, Jr., served in Texas as private, corporal, and sergeant in troop G, 4th U.S. cavalry, Aug. 28, 1894, to June 27, 1897, was promoted 2d lieutenant, 13th infantry, June 8, 1897, and commanded company B at Santiago, Cuba, July 1-4, 1898.

He was a cousin of Brevet Major General Nicholas Longworth Anderson.

See also

References

 Arlington National Cemetery – Anderson gravesite
 Biography
 
 Guide to the Thomas McArthur Anderson Philippines photograph collection 1898-1901, University of Washington Libraries
 Guide to the Thomas McArthur Anderson papers 1822-1973, University of Washington Libraries

United States Army generals
Union Army officers
1836 births
1917 deaths
American military personnel of the Philippine–American War
American military personnel of the Spanish–American War
Burials at Arlington National Cemetery
People from Chillicothe, Ohio
People of Ohio in the American Civil War